Konstantin "Kosta" Nađ (13 May 1911 – 19 November 1986) was a Yugoslav Partisan Army general who fought during World War II.

Biography
Born on 13 May 1911 in Petrovaradin, Kingdom of Croatia-Slavonia, he fought as a volunteer in the Spanish Civil War (1936–39), and also played a prominent part in the Yugoslav People's Liberation War.  

His 3rd Army advanced through Yugoslavia and into Austria before the war ended. He was president of the Yugoslav Partisans' veteran association from 1974 to 1981. He died in Belgrade on 19 November 1986, aged 75.

Commands
He held the following duties:

 General Officer Commanding I Bosnian Corps - 1942 to 1943
 General Officer Commanding III Corps - 1943 to 1944
 General Officer Commanding 1st Army - January 1945
 General Officer Commanding 3rd Army - February 1945

References

1911 births
1986 deaths
People from Petrovaradin
People from the Kingdom of Croatia-Slavonia
Generals of the Yugoslav People's Army
Yugoslav Partisans members
Yugoslav people of the Spanish Civil War
Recipients of the Order of the People's Hero
Burials at Belgrade New Cemetery
Central Committee of the League of Communists of Yugoslavia members
Hungarians in Vojvodina
Recipients of the Order of the Hero of Socialist Labour